Fremont Central Park is a  park in the central area of Fremont, California on Paseo Padre Parkway at Stevenson Boulevard. It is easily accessible from I-880 and I-680. It began development in 1960, and contains Lake Elizabeth, a shallow  man made lake surrounded by picnic areas, sports fields, and walking and biking paths.  The lake was dedicated to Fremont's sister city, Elizabeth, South Australia in 1969.  A nine-hole golf course and driving range is northeast of the park, while a skateboarding park and water slide swimming facility are southwest.

Much of the park was once the Stivers Lagoon and is part of the Laguna Creek Watershed.

Background
A visitor center offers information on the several sites of Fremont and the East Bay. Visitors are able to rent out boats for hourly use at varying rates. The park offers one person and two person kayaks, paddle boats for up to four passengers, stand-up paddle boards and sailboats. Park guests are also permitted to bring their private boats for use on the lake for a $7 launch fee. The park often offers coupons for discounted boat rentals on their site.

Transportation
Most visitors drive or walk to the park, however parking lots overflow on busy weekends. Parking on the curb south of Stevenson and east of Paseo Padre Parkway is prohibited. The Fremont BART station is 1.5 miles (2.4 km) away from the park, and AC Transit provides bus service to the park.

A train tunnel was constructed under the park around 2012 as part of the Warm Springs BART expansion. Underground tracks are costly in comparison to surface tracks, but will lessen the impact of train operations on the park. The cut-and-cover method of tunnel construction was employed. Despite being finished in 2012, the tunnel did not open for revenue service until 2017.

References

External links
 Fremont Central Park

Municipal parks in California
Parks in the San Francisco Bay Area
Geography of Fremont, California
Parks in Alameda County, California
Tourist attractions in Fremont, California
1960 establishments in California